Coswig is a town in the district of Meißen, in Saxony, Germany. It is situated on the right bank of the Elbe, approximately 9 km southeast of Meißen, and 13 km northwest of Dresden. It is the home of Fachkrankenhaus Coswig, a hospital specializing in thoracic surgery.

The town can be reached from Dresden by Dresdner Verkehrsbetriebe's tram route 4, or from both Dresden and Meißen by Dresden S-Bahn line S1 and further regional railway lines at Coswig's railway station.

Sights
Villa Teresa, the home of Eugene d'Albert and Teresa Carreño in Coswig, now a museum

Twin towns – sister cities

Coswig is twinned with:
 Lovosice, Czech Republic
 Ravensburg, Germany

Notable people

Monika Mrklas (born 1942), cross-country skier and cyclist
Hans-Ulrich Thomale (born 1944), footballer and coach
Heinz Werner (1928–2019), porcelain artist

Associated with Coswig
Teresa Carreño (1853–1917), pianist, composer
Eugene d'Albert (1864–1932), composer

References

 
Meissen (district)
Populated riverside places in Germany
Populated places on the Elbe